Alphonsius Johannes Maria Pelser, known as Fons Pelser, (28 December 1893 – 2 July 1974) was a Dutch footballer.

Career
Pelser played for Ajax as a right back, making his senior debut in 1913. He also appeared for the Dutch national side on six occasions.

Pelser suddenly retired from football in 1926, leaving Ajax Football Club until being appointed a Member of Merit in 1938.

Personal life
Fons was born in Nieuwer-Amstel, the son of Johannes Arnoldus Pelser and Hendrika Maria Slief. He was married to Adriana Petronella Maria Schaap.

His brothers Jan, Adriaan and Joop were also all footballers for Ajax, as was his nephew Harry. Fons was the youngest of the four brothers.

References

1893 births
1974 deaths
Dutch footballers
Netherlands international footballers
AFC Ajax players
Footballers from Amsterdam
Association football defenders